Seyyedlar or Seyyed Lar may refer to:
 Seyyedlar, Ardabil
 Seyyed Lar, Ardabil
 Seyyedlar-e Zahra, Ardabil Province
 Seyyedlar, Ahar, East Azerbaijan Province
 Seyyedlar, Khoda Afarin, East Azerbaijan Province
 Seyyedlar, Kandovan, Meyaneh County, East Azerbaijan Province
 Seyyedlar, Qaflankuh-e Gharbi, Meyaneh County, East Azerbaijan Province
 Seyyedlar, Torkamanchay, Meyaneh County, East Azerbaijan Province
 Seyyed Lar, Varzaqan, East Azerbaijan Province
 Seyyedlar-e Olya, East Azerbaijan Province
 Seyyedlar-e Sofla, East Azerbaijan Province
 Seyyed Lar, Gilan
 Seyyedlar, Golestan

See also
 Seyidlər (disambiguation), places in Azerbaijan